The 2006 Norwegian Figure Skating Championships was held in Trondheim on January 28–29, 2006. Skaters competed in the disciplines of men's and ladies' singles. The results were used to choose the teams to the 2006 World Championships, the 2006 European Championships, the 2006 Nordic Championships, and the 2006 World Junior Championships.

Senior results

Men

Ladies

External links
 
 results 

Norwegian Figure Skating Championships
Norwegian Figure Skating Championships, 2006
2006 in Norwegian sport